Kiana Kryeziu (born 11 November 2004) is a Kosovan alpine skier. She competed in the 2022 Winter Olympics.

Career
Kryeziu began racing at the age of 10. After good results at FIS races at the end of 2021 and beginning of 2022, she qualified to represent Kosovo at the 2022 Winter Olympics. She became the first female to represent Kosovo at the Winter Olympics. She was the female flag bearer during the Opening Ceremony. She finished 49th out of 82 competitors in the women's giant slalom.

References

2004 births
Living people
Alpine skiers at the 2022 Winter Olympics
Kosovan female alpine skiers
Olympic alpine skiers of Kosovo